Combapata District is one of eight districts of the province Canchis in Peru.

Geography 
Other mountains are listed below:

 Awkisa
 Kuntur Ikiña
 Puka Urqu
 Wayna Kuntur

The most important rivers of the district are the Willkanuta on the western border of the district and the Sallqa Mayu, one of its right tributaries.

Ethnic groups 
The people in the district are mainly indigenous citizens of Quechua descent. Quechua is the language which the majority of the population (76.08%) learnt to speak in childhood, 23.80% of the residents started speaking using the Spanish language (2007 Peru Census).

See also 
 Ayamach'ay
 Llamachayuq Qaqa

References